Abdulaziz Al-Gumaei (born 8 January 1990) is a Yemeni footballer who plays as a defender.

International career
He made his international debut for Yemen on December 12, 2012 in a match against Bahrain during the 2012 WAFF Championship and played 33 minutes in the 2019 AFC Asian Cup.

References 

1990 births
Living people
Yemeni footballers
Yemeni expatriate footballers
Yemen international footballers
Yemeni expatriate sportspeople in Oman
Yemeni expatriate sportspeople in Jordan
Yemeni expatriate sportspeople in Qatar
Expatriate footballers in Oman
Expatriate footballers in Jordan
Expatriate footballers in Qatar
Al-Ahli Club Sana'a players
Salalah SC players
Shabab Al-Ordon Club players
Mesaimeer SC players
Yemeni League players
Oman Professional League players
Qatari Second Division players
2019 AFC Asian Cup players
Association football defenders